Bargoed railway station serves the town of Bargoed in the county borough of Caerphilly, South Wales. It is a stop on the Rhymney branch of the Valley Lines network. It is located close to the Bargoed Interchange bus station.

History

The junction site and trackbed of the old Brecon line is still visible north of the station.

In 1905 it was renamed Bargoed and Aber Bargoed reverting to its original name in 1924 There was another similarly name station, Aber Bargoed, opened by the Brecon & Merthyr Junction Railway & located on the now defunct Newport line north of Bargoed South Junction.

Services
On Mondays to Saturdays there are departures every 15 minutes southbound to Cardiff Central and Penarth, with an hourly service in the evenings. Sunday trains run every two hours and serve  rather than Penarth.

Northbound there is an hourly service to Rhymney on Mondays to Saturdays with a two-hourly Sunday service. The plan for a half-hourly service through to/from Rhymney was due to be implemented at the December 2013 timetable change, but this has been postponed due to there being insufficient rolling stock available.

The station, which is the northernmost on the double-track section of the branch, has recently seen the reinstatement of a second platform (although it did at one time have three).

Bus station 

Bargoed Interchange, opened in 2011, is a three-minute walk from the railway station.

The redeveloped bus station building was funded through the European Union Regional Development Fund, and through the Welsh Government's Targeted Match Funding, Transport Grant programme, and the Heads of the Valleys Programme.

Bus services run to Newport, Merthyr Tydfil, Blackwood, Caerphilly, Pontypridd, and Ystrad Mynach

References

External links 

Railway stations in Caerphilly County Borough
DfT Category E stations
Former Rhymney Railway stations
Railway stations in Great Britain opened in 1858
Railway stations served by Transport for Wales Rail